Army Liguria (Armee Ligurien, or LXXXXVII Army) was an army formed for the National Republican Army (Esercito Nazionale Repubblicano, or ENR). The ENR was the national army of Italian dictator Benito Mussolini's Italian Social Republic (Repubblica Sociale Italiana, or RSI). Formation of this RSI army started in 1943 and the army was disbanded in 1945. Army Liguria included several German units and its Italian units were sometimes transferred to German formations.

Between November 1944 and February 1945, the formation was alternatively known as Army Group Liguria (Armeegruppe Ligurien) due to the subordination of 14th Army under it.

Formation
On 16 October 1943, the Rastenburg Protocol was signed with Nazi Germany and the RSI was allowed to raise four division-sized military formations.  The four divisions—1st Italian "Italia" Infantry Division, 2nd Italian "Littorio" Infantry Division, 3rd Italian "San Marco" Marine Division, and 4th Italian "Monte Rosa" Alpine Division—were to ultimately total 52,000 men.

Service
In July 1944, the first of these divisions completed training and was sent to the front.  Like the smaller RSI units—the Black Brigades and the Decima Flottiglia MAS—the newly formed RSI divisions generally participated in anti-partisan activities.  While there were exceptions, these divisions saw limited front line action.

As the remaining divisions completed training, they were combined with German units and formed into Army Group Liguria. The RSI Minister of Defense, Rodolfo Graziani, commanded all Army forces of the RSI.

Order of battle
Order of Battle for the LXXXXVII "Liguria" Army - 30 April 1945 
 LXXV Corps
 5th German Mountain Division
 2nd Italian "Littorio" Infantry Division
 34th German Infantry Division
 Lombardia Corps
3rd Italian "San Marco" Marine Infantry Division
134th German Infantry Brigade
4th Italian "Monte Rosa" Alpine Division

The 1st Bersaglieri "Italia" Division was attached to the 14th German Army.

Surrender
On 1 May 1945, Graziani ordered the RSI forces under his command to lay down their arms and Army Group Liguria ceased to exist.  German General Heinrich von Vietinghoff signed the unconditional instrument of surrender for all Axis forces in Italy and his surrender took effect on 2 May.

See also
 List of German Army Groups in World War II
 Italian Co-Belligerent Army
 Alfredo Guzzoni
 Gothic Line order of battle
 Operation Grapeshot order of battle
 Battle of Garfagnana

References

Liguria
Military units and formations established in 1943
Military units and formations disestablished in 1945
Field armies of Germany in World War II